Kaggaladu is a village in the Sira Taluk of Tumkur district in the south of Karnataka, India. Since 1999, the village has been a host for painted storks and grey herons, which annually breed and raise their young ones on the trees inside the village. Kaggaladu is located about 9 km to the north-west of Sira, a town on the Sira-Changavara Main Road and the heronry was first made known to the outside world in 1999 by members of the Tumkur-based NGO Wildlife Aware Nature Club.

History of the Park
According to locals, the grey herons have been nesting here on a single tamarind tree since 1993. Their numbers increased in 1996, when a lone tree in the neighbouring Muddenahalli, on which these birds were nesting, was disturbed by poachers and some birds were killed. The villagers are so interested in conserving the birds that, they do not harvest the tamarind in the trees owned by them as well that of the Government. While many of the villagers are interested in protecting the birds just because they look beautiful, a few believe them as harbingers of prosperity, hence their protection.

Natural History of the heronry

Fauna
As the area lies in the plains of the Deccan Plateau, bordering Andhra Pradesh, the wildlife found here is related to the drier areas. WANC is compiling a detailed report of the flora and fauna found in the area. But notably a few herds of blackbuck roam around Kaggaladu and surrounding villages. Also some of the villagers claim to have sighted the great Indian bustard in the area, but this has not yet been confirmed.

Bird Sanctuary
The birds usually stay in Kaggaladu Bird Sanctuary for about six months, starting from the month of February. The birds start arriving in groups for the nestling season. By the end of August, the migratory birds depart.

Kaggaladu is said to be the second largest painted storks sanctuary in South India, after Kokrebellur sanctuary in Mandya district, Karnataka. It has been observed that, many birds of the foreign origin also migrate to Kaggaladu during the nestling season.

In this bird sanctuary, one can find the birds in flocks of hundreds, but the big gathering of birds is not of the same feather. The tamarind trees have been maintained exclusively for birds shelter and nestling. It has been reported that, the villagers of Kaggaladu are very much attached to these migrating birds.

References

 Breeding colony of storks found in Karnataka - News story from Indian Express, Bangalore, Monday, 22 March 1999
 Large nesting colony of Painted storks identified near Sira (Karnataka) - News Letter for Birdwatchers Mar-Apr.1999, Vol.39, No:2 and Myforest (Quarterly Journal of Karnataka Forest Department) March 1999

External links

 'Lost in wilderness' A story on Kaggaladu in Deccan Herald
 Information and pictures on Kaggaladu Heronry
 Some images of Kaggaladu- ಕಗ್ಗಲಾಡು

Bird sanctuaries of Karnataka
Villages in Tumkur district